Chaukul Village is located near Sawantwadi taluka of Sindhudurg district, Maharashtra State in India.

Chaukul receives excessive rain. Paddy and banana are the main crops cultivated here. Much of the farming takes place after the monsoons withdraw.

References

Villages in Sindhudurg district
Hill stations in Maharashtra